Heidi Lenhart is an American actress best known for her lead role in the Au Pair film series and the sitcom California Dreams.

Family 
She is the daughter of Cheryl Saban and Ray Lenhart, a disc jockey. She has an older sister, Tifanie, who is a voice actress. Neither she nor her sister have a relationship with their birth father. Through her mother's marriage to billionaire Haim Saban, she has a half-brother and a half-sister: Ness and Tanya.

Acting career 
She starred as Jenny Garrison in the NBC teen comedy series California Dreams during its first season (1992–93) . Lenhart later went to star in the syndicated television drama Fame L.A. from 1997 to 1998, and had a recurring role in the final season of Fox prime time soap opera Beverly Hills, 90210 (2000).

In film, Lenhart played the leading role of Jennifer "Jenny" Morgan in Au Pair (1999), and its two sequels Au Pair II (2002), and Au Pair 3: Adventure in Paradise (2009).

Philanthropy career 
Lenhart served as a board member for her mother's non-profit, the Cheryl Saban Self-Worth Foundation for Women and Girls as a parenting, health and wellness, and education advocate and subsequently was named a director of the organization.

Personal life
In 2002, Lenhart married actor Robin Dunne, with whom she co-starred in Au Pair II. They divorced in 2005. She subsequently married actor-musician Chris Stills in 2006, with whom she has two daughters. Lenhart filed for divorce in 2011. She writes poetry and lives in a suburb of Los Angeles.

Filmography

References

External links
 

American film actresses
American child actresses
American television actresses
American voice actresses
American voice directors
Living people
Actresses from Los Angeles
20th-century American actresses
21st-century American actresses
Year of birth missing (living people)